Académie Ny Antsika is a football club in Vakinankaratra, Madagascar.  In January 2009, an Academie Ny Antsika match against US Stade Tamponnaise was canceled due to the 2009 political violence.

Achievements
THB Champions League: 1
2008

Performance in CAF competitions
CAF Champions League: 1 appearance
2009: Preliminary Round

References

Football clubs in Madagascar
2000 establishments in Madagascar